Yahia Ouahabi (born 1 August 1940) is a retired Algerian footballer who played as a defender.

Career
Ouahabi was born in Sidi-Aïssa, Algeria. He started his playing career at age 11 with home-town team SS Sidi-Aïssa. At age 16, he left for France and joined the academy at AS Saint-Étienne where he turned pro and played until the age of 22. He also had a brief spell with Roanne in the 1957–58 season. On 1 January 1963, just after Algeria won its independence, he left France and moved back to Algeria and joined JS Kabylie (JSK).

He played for JSK from 1963 until 1971, helping the team gain promotion from the third division to the second division and eventually to the top division. He is considered one of the best left-wings in the history of JSK. After he retired from playing, he coached JSK's junior team briefly before quitting football for good.

Ouahabi received his first call-up to the Algerian National Team in 1956, at age 16. He was the youngest player on the team along with Hacène Lalmas.

References

Living people
1940 births
Association football defenders
Algerian footballers
Algeria international footballers
AS Saint-Étienne players
JS Kabylie players
21st-century Algerian people